The Army of Victory (Jaysh al-Nasr) is an armed opposition faction participating in the Syrian Civil War. Founded in August 2015 as a joint operations room of 16 member groups, three of the groups later fully merged into Jaysh al-Nasr. The group was supplied with US-made BGM-71 TOW anti-tank missiles.

History

Formation as a joint operations room
Jaysh al-Nasr was formed in early August 2015 as a joint operations room with the stated objective being the "liberation of the northern countryside of Hama, breaking the regime's first defense line toward the city of Hama." It was announced as a first step towards unifying the Free Syrian Army in Idlib and Hama provinces into a single operations room. The alliance initially comprised the following 16 groups:

 Falcons of al-Ghab 
 Gathering of Glory
 Levant Front
 Salvation Front
 Falcons of Mount Zawiya Brigade 
 6th Brigade
 111th Brigade
 60th Brigade
 Bilad ash-Sham Brigade
 111th Regiment
 Revolutionary Fedayeen Movement (former member of the Army of Revolutionaries)
 Hawks of Jihad Battalion
 Martyrs of Tremseh Brigade
 Al-Mashhour Battalions
 Antiquities Brigade

Reformation as a unified group
In late October 2015, it was announced that three of its component groups, the Falcons of al-Ghab, 111th Regiment, and the Salvation Front, completely merged into Jaysh al-Nasr with Suqour al-Ghab's commander, Major Muhammad Mansour, assuming the leadership of the new unified group. In late September 2016, the group previously known as Liwa Ahrar Darayya (who had been evacuated from Darayya due to a deal made with the Syrian government) announced their merge into Jaysh al-Nasr.

Jaysh al-Nasr have taken mainly Alawite civilians, including children, as prisoners. 112 of them were released from Qalaat al-Madiq on 7 February 2017 as part of a prisoner exchange.

Rebel infighting

On 7 February 2017, Jund al-Aqsa attacked the headquarters of Jaysh al-Nasr near the town of Murak in northern Hama. Jund al-Aqsa captured more than 250 fighters from Jaysh al-Nasr. On 14 February, they reportedly killed at least 80 Jaysh al-Nasr prisoners before withdrawing from their positions north of Khan Shaykhun. Kafr Nuboudah and Kafr Zita villages were the origin of the Jaysh Nasr members whom Liwa al-Aqsa executed according to Moussa al-Omar. The casualties given for Jaysh Nasr were 56 fighters, 3 media reporters, and 11 military commanders, according to Moussa al-Omar. After Jund al-Aqsa committed slaughter at Khan Shaykhun, only one person lived to tell the tale.

After the infighting with Jund al-Aqsa, Captain Muhannad Junaid of Jaysh al-Nasr stated that "The whole of Idlib will be painted black".

On 22 May 2017, first lieutenant Alaa Rakhmon of Jaysh al-Nasr was assassinated by unknown assailants in the village of Kafr Nabudah. Rakhmon was a prominent operator of BGM-71 TOW missiles and was responsible for destroying several Syrian Army tanks during the 2017 Hama offensive.

Turkish support
Western financial support for Jaysh al-Nasr largely ended in October 2017. On 9 February 2018, the 111th Regiment and the Salvation Front left Jaysh al-Nasr. The Falcons of al-Ghab, led by Major Muhammad Mansour, became the only significant faction left in the group. Turkey continues to provide financial and military support for Jaysh al-Nasr and other rebel groups in the region. In exchange for continued support, Turkey requested these rebel groups to participate in the Turkish military operation in Afrin, which Jaysh al-Nasr did beginning on 16 February. On the same day, Jaysh al-Nasr appointed 3 new leaders.

In May 2018, along with 10 other rebel groups in northwestern Syria, the Army of Victory formed the National Front for Liberation, which was officially announced on 28 May. Maj. Muhammad Mansour, commander of Jaysh al-Nasr, was appointed chief of staff of the formation.

After it left the Army of Victory, the 111th Regiment joined the Sham Legion's northern Hama branch, which is also part of the NFL. On 6 January 2019, the Sham Legion expelled the 111th Regiment for insubordination.

See also
List of armed groups in the Syrian Civil War

References

External links
 Official website

Anti-government factions of the Syrian civil war
Free Syrian Army
Military units and formations established in 2015
Turkish supported militant groups of the Syrian civil war